Halvard Olsen (23 January 1886 – 5 August 1966) was a Norwegian politician and trade Union leader.

Olsen was born in Kvæfjord. He chaired the Norwegian Union of Iron and Metal Workers from 1919, and then the Norwegian Confederation of Trade Unions from 1925 to 1934.

He was also deputy chairman of the Communist Party of Norway and the first holders of this post.

In 1946, he was sentenced to forced labour, but pardoned in 1950.

References

1886 births
1966 deaths
People from Kvæfjord
Norwegian sailors
Labour Party (Norway) politicians
Communist Party of Norway politicians
Norwegian trade unionists
Members of Nasjonal Samling

People convicted of treason for Nazi Germany against Norway